The 1973 Cronulla-Sutherland Sharks season was the seventh in the club's history. They competed in the New South Wales Rugby Football League's 1973 season.

Three Cronulla players, Ken Maddison, Greg Pierce and Steve Rogers were selected to make their international representative debuts for Australia in 1973.

Ladder

References

Cronulla-Sutherland Sharks seasons
Cronulla-Sutherland Sharks season